Obscuriphantes is a genus of dwarf spiders that was first described by Michael I. Saaristo & A. V. Tanasevitch in 2000.

Species
 it contains three species and one subspecies:
Obscuriphantes bacelarae (Schenkel, 1938) – Portugal, Spain, France
Obscuriphantes obscurus (Blackwall, 1841) (type) – Europe, Turkey, Caucasus, Russia (Europe to West Siberia), China
Obscuriphantes o. dilutior (Simon, 1929) – France
Obscuriphantes pseudoobscurus (Marusik, Hippa & Koponen, 1996) – Russia (Middle Siberia to Far East), Kazakhstan

See also
 List of Linyphiidae species (I–P)

References

Araneomorphae genera
Linyphiidae
Spiders of Asia